Ancalomicrobium  is a genus of bacteria from the order of Hyphomicrobiales.

References

Hyphomicrobiales
Monotypic bacteria genera
Bacteria described in 1968
Bacteria genera